Pseudotyphula is a genus of fungus in the family Marasmiaceae. The genus is monotypic, containing the single species Pseudotyphula ochracea, found in North America. The genus was circumscribed by British mycologist E.J.H. Corner in 1953.

See also

List of Marasmiaceae genera

References

External links

Marasmiaceae
Monotypic Agaricales genera
Fungi of North America
Taxa named by E. J. H. Corner